"Poor Boy Blues", or "Poor Boy, Long Ways From Home", is a traditional blues song that has been cited as one of the oldest in the genre.  As with most traditional blues songs, there is great variation in the melody and lyrical content as performed by different artists.  However, there is often a core verse containing some variation of the line "I'm a poor boy a long way from home."

Blues historian  described it as:

The song is often associated with a slide guitar accompaniment. Gus Cannon recalled hearing a slide guitarist named Alec or Alex Lee in Coahoma County around 1900, playing a version of the song. In 1937, Cannon recorded the song under the pseudonym Banjo Joe for Paramount Records. He performed the piece using a slide on a five string banjo, with guitar accompaniment by Blind Blake.

A version recorded by Howlin' Wolf in 1957 is described by Herzhaft as "a sensational rendering". Chess Records issued it as a single, with another traditional song, "Sitting on Top of the World" as the second side.

References

Year of song unknown
Blues songs
Howlin' Wolf songs
Songwriter unknown